A rapid deployment force is a military formation that is capable of fast deployment. Such forces typically consist of elite military units (special forces, paratroopers, marines, etc.) and are usually trained at a higher intensity than the rest of their country's military. They usually receive priority in equipment and training to prepare them for their missions. A quick reaction force (QRF) or rapid reaction force should not be confused with Rapid Deployment Forces (US) or Rapid Response (NATO). QRF units are most often units that react to local or regional issues within their area of jurisdiction, e.g. National Guard, militias, Forward Deployed, para-military forces, etc. One example of a National Guard Unit that was classified as a Rapid Deployment Force was Troop E, 31st Cavalry based out of Sylacauga, Alabama.

Rapid deployment forces in most militaries are used for deployment outside of their country's borders. The US Army's 82nd Airborne Division, 75th Ranger Regiment and the 101st Airborne Division all share the responsibility of Rapid Deployment Forces. Both units have the mission of having combat troops "Wheels Up" (en route by aircraft) within 18 hours of executive notification. Both units have the capability of "Forced Entry" into a territory to seize and secure key terrain, e.g. Drop Zone (DZ), airfield or airport, to accommodate follow up forces. A good example of this was the Operation Urgent Fury. The Rangers were at the staging base in Barbados in less than 18 hours from notification followed by the 82nd Airborne Division. The title of Rapid Deployment Forces is often associated with the US Marines. Members of the United States Marine Corps are stationed worldwide on ships, off the coasts of troubled regions and are already in place. That mission status usually places them into the category of "Forward Deployed" in the same manner as the United States Army's 2nd Infantry Division in the Republic of Korea (ROK) is forward-deployed on the DMZ.

Examples
Examples of Rapid Deployment Forces include:

  Argentine Rapid Deployment Force (FDR)
  Rapid Deployment Force (FUDRA)
  Egyptian Rapid deployment forces
  Finnish Rapid Deployment Force (FRDF)
 / Rapid Forces Division
   Indonesian Quick Reaction Forces Command
   Indonesian Army Strategic Command
  Indonesian Marine Corps 
 Nedsa Corps
  NATO Rapid Deployable Corps – Italy
  Central Readiness Regiment
  10th Parachute Brigade
  Netherlands Marine Corps
  Norwegian Telemark Battalion
  710th Special Operations Wing 
  Rapid Reaction Brigade
  Guards
  Air Mobile Brigade
  31st Infantry Regiment, King's Guard
  Immediate Response Force
  Marine Expeditionary Unit
  XVIII Airborne Corps
  75th Ranger Regiment
 / Airborne Troops (VDV)
  Helsinki Headline Goal Force Catalogue
  European Union Battlegroups
  NATO Response Force

See also 
 Expeditionary warfare
 Power projection

References

Military units and formations by type
Military deployment
Expeditionary warfare

ru:Войска быстрого реагирования
fi:Nopean toiminnan joukot